Réka Vidáts (born 19 July 1979) is a Hungarian former professional tennis player.

Biography
As a junior, Vidáts was an Australian Open quarter-finalist and had a win over Martina Hingis, at the Italian Junior Championships in 1994.

Vidáts reached a top ranking of 193 on the professional tour. She twice received a wildcard to compete in the main draw of the Hungarian Ladies Open and featured as a qualifier at the 1995 Indonesia Open. In 1997 she played in Wimbledon qualifiers and appeared in three Fed Cup ties for Hungary.

Based in Marbella, Vidáts now runs an events company.

ITF finals

Singles (1–1)

Doubles (2–4)

See also
List of Hungary Fed Cup team representatives

References

External links
 
 
 

1979 births
Living people
Hungarian female tennis players
Hungarian expatriate sportspeople in Spain